The 1999–00 NBA season was the 54th season for the Boston Celtics in the National Basketball Association. During the off-season, the Celtics acquired Danny Fortson, and former Celtics forward Eric Williams from the Denver Nuggets, and signed free agents Calbert Cheaney, and undrafted rookie guard Adrian Griffin. In their third season under head coach Rick Pitino, the Celtics won their first three games, but played below .500 for the first few months, holding a 21–28 record at the All-Star break. At midseason, the team traded Fortson to the Toronto Raptors in exchange for Alvin Williams, but the trade was voided due to Williams failing his physical exam; Fortson only played 55 games this season due to a stress fracture in his right foot. The Celtics struggled and suffered a ten-game losing streak between March and April, but managed to win five of their final six games. Fans and the media began to show their impatience with the struggling franchise, who finished out of the playoffs again with a 35–47 record, fifth in the Atlantic Division.

Second-year star Paul Pierce had a stellar season, averaging 19.5 points, 5.4 rebounds and 2.1 steals per game, while Antoine Walker averaged 20.5 points, 8.0 rebounds and 1.4 steals per game, and Kenny Anderson contributed 14.0 points, 5.1 assists and 1.7 steals per game. In addition, Vitaly Potapenko provided the team with 9.2 points and 6.3 rebounds per game, and Griffin provided with 6.7 points, 5.2 rebounds and 1.6 steals per game. Off the bench, Fortson averaged 7.6 points and 6.7 rebounds per game, while Williams and Dana Barros both contributed 7.2 points per game each, and Tony Battie provided with 6.6 points and 5.0 rebounds per game.

Following the season, Barros was traded to the Dallas Mavericks, who then traded him to the Detroit Pistons two months later, while Cheaney was traded to the Denver Nuggets, Fortson was dealt to the Golden State Warriors, and Pervis Ellison signed as a free agent with the Seattle SuperSonics. For the season, the team added their alternate logo of a cloverleaf above the shorts of their uniforms.

Draft picks

Roster

Roster Notes
 Guard/forward Greg Minor missed the entire season due to a hip injury.

Regular season

Season standings

Record vs. opponents

Game log

Player statistics

Awards and records

Transactions

See also
 Reebok Pro Summer League, a summer league hosted by the Celtics

References

Boston Celtics seasons
Boston Celtics
Boston Celtics
Boston Celtics
Celtics
Celtics